Rizvan Farzaliyev (born 1 September 1979), is an Azerbaijani futsal player who plays for Araz Naxçivan as a defender. He is captain of the Azerbaijan national team. He scored the last penalty in 2011, which helped his country to reach the semifinals, beating Ukraine, in Uefa Futsal Euro.  Azerbaijan lost in to Portugal in the semifinals, in penalty shot out.  It was the country's best performance in this sport. Rizvan Farzaliyev, by playing in all three games, equalled Lúcio's record of 69 UEFA futsal club appearances.

References

1979 births
Living people
Azerbaijani men's futsal players
Futsal defenders